WagerWeb.com is a Costa Rica based sports book that offers betting lines on an array of sporting and media related events.

History 
Founded in 1994, the company is a privately held online gaming company, licensed and located in San Jose, Costa Rica. Wagerweb.ag features an online sportsbook and racebook, an online casino and an online poker room.  The company caters to a mostly American customer base. Besides normal sports events, WagerWeb offers betting lines on media related events.

From their conception until 2004 WagerWeb employed betcbs.com as its primary operating site. WagerWeb was forced to migrate and adopt WagerWeb.com as a their primary site due to violating CBS Inc.'s trademark.  Wagerweb never released the domain to CBS but agreed not to use the domain for gaming purposes.

In Spring of 2013, WagerWeb.com rebranded to WagerWeb.ag and in 2018 to WagerWeb.eu.

References

External links
Official site

Online gambling companies of Costa Rica